Calumma tsaratananense, the Tsaratanana chameleon, is a species of chameleon found in Madagascar.

Range and habitat
Calumma tsaratananense is known only from the Tsaratanana Massif, Madagascar's highest mountain, located in the northern portion of the island. It inhabits high-elevation heathland between 2,500 and 2,850 meters elevation in the ericoid thickets ecoregion. Its area of occupancy (AOO) is not well known. Tsaratanana Massif has an area of 492 km2, but the chameleon's range is less than less than 100 km6, and may be as little as 6 km2.

References

Calumma
Reptiles of Madagascar
Reptiles described in 1967
Taxa named by Édouard-Raoul Brygoo
Taxa named by Charles Domergue
Madagascar ericoid thickets